Charaxes baileyi is a butterfly in the family Nymphalidae. It is found in Kenya, west of the Rift Valley. The habitat consists of riparian forests and bush  

The larvae feed on Scutia myrtina.

Taxonomy
Charaxes baileyi is a member of the large species group Charaxes etheocles

See also
Kakamega Forest
Mount Elgon National Park

References

Victor Gurney Logan Van Someren, 1969 Revisional notes on African Charaxes (Lepidoptera: Nymphalidae). Part V. Bulletin of the British Museum (Natural History) (Entomology)75-166.

External links
African Charaxes/Charaxes Africains Eric Vingerhoedt
Images of C. baileyi  Royal Museum for Central Africa (Albertine Rift Project)
Charaxes baileyi images at Consortium for the Barcode of Life 
African Butterfly Database Range map via search

Butterflies described in 1958
baileyi
Endemic insects of Kenya
Butterflies of Africa